Walter Edward Sachs (May 28, 1884 – August 21, 1980) was an American banker and financier.

Biography
He was born on May 28, 1884 in Manhattan, New York City to Samuel Sachs and Louisa Goldman of the Goldman–Sachs family. He was an alumnus of Harvard Business School.

Sachs was a partner at Goldman Sachs starting in 1928, guiding the company through the Great Depression.

He married Mary Williamson in 1939  and divorced in 1960.

He retired as a partner in 1959 to become a limited partner. He died at his home in Darien, Connecticut on August 21, 1980.

References

Further reading

1884 births
1980 deaths
Businesspeople from New York City
American financiers
American people of German-Jewish descent
Harvard Business School alumni
20th-century American businesspeople